A total lunar eclipse took place on Thursday, April 24, 1986, the first of two total lunar eclipses in 1986, the second being on October 17, 1986. The Moon was plunged into darkness for 1 hour, 3 minutes and 34.8 seconds, in a deep total eclipse which saw the Moon 20.217% of its diameter inside the Earth's umbral shadow. The visual effect of this depends on the state of the Earth's atmosphere, but the Moon may have been stained a deep red colour. The partial eclipse lasted for 3 hours, 18 minutes and 46.8 seconds in total. The Moon was just 1.2 days before perigee (Perigee on Friday, April 25, 1986), making it 5.3% larger than average.

Visibility 
It is seen rising over eastern Asia, the Pacific Ocean, and western North America and South America, the eclipse is also seen setting over the whole of Europe, Africa and Western Asia. The eclipse was seen very visible over the Philippines, it becomes the first lunar eclipse after the EDSA Revolution since the two lunar eclipses happened between May 4, 1985 and October 28, 1985 and the second followed on October 17, 1986. It also followed on February 20, 1989.

Eclipses in 1986 are:

Partial Solar eclipse of April 9, 1986

Total Lunar Eclipse of April 24, 1986

Hybrid Solar eclipse of October 3, 1986

Total Lunar Eclipse of October 17, 1986 (October 1986 lunar eclipse)

It also followed the passage of Halley's comet in the same year.

Related lunar eclipses

Eclipses of 1986 
 A partial solar eclipse on April 9.
 A total lunar eclipse on April 24.
 A hybrid solar eclipse on October 3.
 A total lunar eclipse on October 17.

Lunar year series

Saros series 

It is the third total lunar eclipse of the series. The next occurrence will be on May 4, 2004. The previous occurrence was April 13, 1968.

Metonic series 

This eclipse is the third of four Metonic cycle lunar eclipses on the same date, April 23–24, each separated by 19 years:

Half-Saros cycle
A lunar eclipse will be preceded and followed by solar eclipses by 9 years and 5.5 days (a half saros). This lunar eclipse is related to two annular solar eclipses of Solar Saros 138.

See also 
List of lunar eclipses
List of 20th-century lunar eclipses
Blood Moon
Orbit of the Moon

Notes

External links 
 

1986-04
1986 in science
April 1986 events